E77 may refer to:
 King's Indian Defense, Encyclopaedia of Chess Openings code
 European route E77, an international road
 E 77 road (United Arab Emirates)
 E77 balloon bomb, an American anti-crop biological munition
 DRG Class E 77, a German locomotive class
 San Manuel Airport FAA code near San Manuel, Arizona, United States
 Kyushu Chūō Expressway, route E77 in Japan